Akshay Kumar Maitreya (1 March 1861–10 February 1930) was an Indian historian and social worker from Bengal.

Life
Maitreya was born in Nadia (now in West Bengal) to Mathuranath Maitreya. Much of his education was in Kolkata and Rajshahi (in Bangladesh). He passed his B.L. examination from Rajshahi College. He was a friend of Rabindranath Tagore, but famously engaged with him in an argument about whether history based fiction should necessarily represent historical facts correctly. Maitreya, being a historian, called for historical correctitude, while Tagore declared that an artist has freedom to bend historical facts.

Maitreya was instrumental in creating the Varendra Research Museum, Rajshahi. He was also credited for disproving the Black Hole of Calcutta theory used by the colonial British to discredit Siraj Ud Daulah in a seminar organized by the Calcutta Historical Society on 24 March 1916. His most significant work is Gaudalekhamala. It consists the Sanskrit texts (along with their translations in Bengali) of a number of stone and copper-plate inscriptions issued by the Pala emperors.

Works
Maitreya's works include:
 Samarsimha (1883)
 Sitaram Ray (1898)
 Sirajuddaulah (1898)
 Mir Qasim (1906)
 Aitihasik Chitra (Snapshots of History)
 Gaudalekhamala (The epigraphs of Gaud), Rajshahi (1912)
 Phiringi Banik (European Traders) (1922)
 " Sagarika"
 " Rani Bhabani"

References

Rajshahi College alumni
People from West Bengal
1861 births
1930 deaths
Bengali Hindus
Bengali historians